Pusiola holoxantha is a moth in the subfamily Arctiinae. It was described by George Hampson in 1918. It is found in Malawi and Mozambique.

References

Moths described in 1918
Lithosiini
Moths of Sub-Saharan Africa
Lepidoptera of Malawi
Lepidoptera of Mozambique